The Guadeloupean Objective (OG) is a political party in the French overseas department of Guadeloupe. It was founded on 18 March 2000 by Lucette Michaux-Chevry, the then-president of the Regional Council of Guadeloupe, and Guadeloupe MP Philippe Chaulet.

The party has two seats in the French National Assembly in the group of the Union for a Popular Movement.

References 

Political parties in Guadeloupe